Podalonia affinis  is a Palearctic species of thread-waisted wasp.

References

External links
Images representing  Podalonia affinis 

Hymenoptera of Europe
Chrysididae
Insects described in 1798